Long'an County is a county of Guangxi Zhuang Autonomous Region, South China, it is under the administration of the prefecture-level city of Nanning, the capital of Guangxi. The westernmost county-level division of Nanning, it borders the prefecture-level cities of Chongzuo to the west and Baise to the northwest.

Climate

References

External links 

Counties of Guangxi
Nanning